Euan James Robertson (14 June 1948 – 11 December 1995) was a New Zealand distance runner in the 1970s, one of the great periods of New Zealand distance running.

Early life
He was born in Lower Hutt near Wellington and educated at Scots College and Massey University, where he gained a degree in agricultural soil science. He was a soil conservator for the Ministry of Works from 1973, then moving to Cambridge and Auckland and gaining an MBA degree.

Running career
At the 1974 Commonwealth Games he was fifth in the 3000m steeplechase.

He was accepted by the selectors for the 1976 Summer Olympics on his fourth attempt, after running in Stockholm and achieving a New Zealand record time. He finished sixth in the 3000m steeplechase at Montreal; reducing the New Zealand record from his 8 minutes 22.8 seconds at Stockholm to 8 minutes 21.08 seconds.

Euan spent a number of years in Dunedin where he ran for the Mornington Harrier Club.

At the 1978 Commonwealth Games he was fourth in the 3000m steeplechase.

He ran in the 3000m steeplechase, and cross-country; and later won New Zealand senior titles in the 5000m, 10,000m, 3000m steeplechase and cross-country.

He represented New Zealand at the World Cross Country Championships on a number of occasions. His finest hour came in 1975 in Morocco where he finished 5th - one place behind John Walker.

Death
On December 1995, Euan was running with a group of young athletes on the sand dunes at Bethells Beach near Auckland when he collapsed and died of a heart attack, aged 47.

References

External links
 
 

1948 births
1995 deaths
New Zealand male middle-distance runners
New Zealand male long-distance runners
Athletes (track and field) at the 1974 British Commonwealth Games
Athletes (track and field) at the 1976 Summer Olympics
Athletes (track and field) at the 1978 Commonwealth Games
Olympic athletes of New Zealand
Commonwealth Games competitors for New Zealand
Athletes from Lower Hutt
People educated at Wellington College (New Zealand)
Massey University alumni
New Zealand male steeplechase runners
New Zealand male cross country runners